The 1st Sarasaviya Awards festival (Sinhala: 1වැනි සරසවිය සම්මාන උලෙළ), presented by the Associated Newspapers of Ceylon Limited, was held to honor the best films of 1961, 1962 and 1963 in Sinhala cinema on May 9, 1964, at the Asoka Cinema, Colombo, Sri Lanka. Senate President Thomas Amarasuriya was the chief guest at the awards night.

The film Gamperaliya won the most awards with nine including Best Film.

Awards

References

Sarasaviya Awards
Sarasaviya